Toi et moi is a 2006 French romantic comedy-drama film directed by Julie Lopes-Curval. The film stars Marion Cotillard, Julie Depardieu and Jonathan Zaccaï.

Cast 
 Marion Cotillard as Lena
 Julie Depardieu as Ariane
 Tomer Sisley as Farid
 Éric Berger as François
 Jonathan Zaccaï as Mark Bajik
 Chantal Lauby as Éléonore
 Carole Franck as Sandrine
 Sergio Peris Mencheta as Pablo
 Philippe Le Fèvre as Jérémie
 Sabine Balasse as Corinne

References

External links 
 
 

2006 films
2006 romantic comedy-drama films
2000s French-language films
French romantic comedy-drama films
Films directed by Julie Lopes-Curval
2000s French films